Roy P. Peterson (November 16, 1934 - November 28, 1998) was an American academic administrator. He served as the president of Tennessee State University, a historically black public university in Nashville, Tennessee, from 1985 to 1986.

Early life
Peterson was born on November 16, 1934. He graduated from Southern University, where he earned a bachelor's degree. He earned a master's degree from the University of Oregon, and a PhD from the University of Iowa.

Career
Peterson served as the interim president of Tennessee State University from 1985 to 1986.

Peterson briefly worked for the Illinois Oversight Board of Higher Education. He was assistant to the executive director of the Kentucky Council on Higher Education from 1986 to 1995. He served as the secretary of the Kentucky Education, Arts and Humanities Cabinet from 1995 to 1998.

Personal life and death
With his wife Juanita, Peterson had two sons and a daughter. They resided in Lexington, Kentucky.

Peterson died of lung cancer on November 28, 1998, in Lexington, at 64.

References

1934 births
1998 deaths
People from Lexington, Kentucky
Southern University alumni
University of Oregon alumni
University of Iowa
Tennessee State University presidents
African-American academics
Deaths from lung cancer in Kentucky
20th-century African-American people
20th-century American academics